This is a list of the tallest buildings in the United Kingdom by settlement. The article includes all cities and towns with a population over 100,000. This list is based on criteria set out by the Council on Tall Buildings and Urban Habitat which excludes structures such as telecommunication towers and church spires from being labelled as a 'skyscraper or tall building'.

References

 
Settlement